La Riviere, also known as the William Ingles House, is a historic home located at Radford, Virginia. It was built in 1892–1893 by Captain Billy Ingles, the great-grandson of Colonel William Ingles, and is a two-story Queen Anne house with a brick first story and a stuccoed frame second story. The house sits on rock-faced limestone blocks and has a slate-sheathed hipped roof. It features a three-story battlemented tower, a conservatory, and a curving wraparound porch.  Also on the property are a contributing cook's house, garage, ice house, drive, and wall and gate.

It was listed on the National Register of Historic Places in 1994.

References

Houses on the National Register of Historic Places in Virginia
Houses completed in 1893
Queen Anne architecture in Virginia
Houses in Radford, Virginia
National Register of Historic Places in Radford, Virginia